This is a list of electoral results for the electoral district of Burns Beach in Western Australian state elections.

Results

Elections in the 2020s

Elections in the 2010s

References 

Western Australian state electoral results by district